Langevin is a crater on the far side of the Moon. It is located to the east of the walled plain Campbell, and to the west of the crater Chandler.

This is a heavily damaged crater that has been worn and battered by multiple overlapping impacts. Apart from the depression Langevin creates in the surface, it is scarcely distinguishable from the surrounding terrain. The outer rim and interior features have lost much of their original definition due to this wear. Multiple small craters lie along the rim, including a cluster along the southwest and a crater along the northeast rim. The interior is pock-marked by many small craterlets.

Satellite craters
By convention these features are identified on lunar maps by placing the letter on the side of the crater midpoint that is closest to Langevin.

References

 
 
 
 
 
 
 
 
 
 
 
 

Impact craters on the Moon